Amar Choudhury (1897 – 30 August 1948) was an Indian film actor, director, editor and writer. He wrote and directed Jamai Shashthi in 1931 produced by Madan Theatre Limited, credited as the first Bengali talkie. He acted in this film too as in all of the films written and directed by him. It was released on 11 April 1931 at Crown Cinema Hall in Calcutta in the same year as Alam Ara, the first Indian talkie was released.

Filmography
Silent Feature Film Works of Late Sri Amar Chowdhury 

As per data accumulated from Bengali film magazine "Chitrobaani, 1956 edition".

Talkie Feature Film Works of Late Sri Amar Chowdhury 

As per data accumulated from Bengali film magazine "Chitrobaani, 1956 edition".

References

External links

Bengali film directors
Year of death unknown
Male actors in Bengali cinema
University of Calcutta alumni
20th-century Indian male actors
People from British India
Articles containing video clips
Indian male silent film actors
20th-century Indian film directors
1897 births
Film directors from Kolkata